The following is a list of episodes of the British television sitcom Josh, which is about three young adults who share a flat in London. It began airing on BBC Three on 29 August 2014.

Episodes

Pilot (2014)

Series 1 (2015)

Series 2 (2016)

Series 3 (2017)

References

BBC-related lists
Lists of British sitcom episodes